General elections were held in the Republic of Artsakh on 31 March 2020, with a second round of the presidential election on 14 April. Voters elected the President and 33 members of the National Assembly. It was the first time the President and National Assembly were elected at the same time.

The Free Motherland - UCA Alliance, United Motherland, Justice, ARF, and the Democratic Party won seats in National Assembly. No party won the majority of seats, which means that coalition talks are likely to be held within parties.

Presidential candidate Arayik Harutyunyan came first in the first round of the presidential election. A run-off between him and incumbent Foreign Minister Masis Mayilyan was held on 14 April 2020. However, Masis Mayilyan made an announcement urging the people of Artsakh not to participate in the second round of elections in order to prevent the spread of COVID-19. As a result, the majority of Mayilyan's voters from the first round did not vote, and turnout in the second round declined by nearly 30%. However, a majority of Harutyunyan's voters did return to the polls for the second round, in spite of the call to avoid spreading COVID-19, giving him a wide margin of victory in the second round.

Background 
Presidential elections were initially scheduled to be held by popular vote in 2017, five years after the 2012 elections. However, after a constitutional referendum in 2017, the country switched from a semi-presidential system to a presidential system. As a result, in the 2017 presidential elections the National Assembly re-elected Bako Sahakyan as president for the next three years until the general election.

The incumbent President Bako Sahakyan declared that he would not run in the elections.

Electoral system 
The President of Artsakh is elected using the two-round system. If a candidate takes more than 50% of the overall vote, he or she is declared elected. If the 50% threshold is not met by any candidate, a second round of voting is held. In the second round, only the two most popular candidates from the first round may participate. The winner of the second round is elected President of Artsakh.

Members of the National Assembly will be elected by proportional representation, with between 27 and 33 MPs; the number will be defined by the Electoral Code.

Presidential candidates
 Arayik Harutyunyan, presidential advisor, former Prime Minister and State Minister. Endorsed by the Artsakh Republican Party.
 Masis Mayilyan, incumbent Foreign Affairs Minister; officially an independent candidate but supported by the New Artsakh Alliance and endorsed by Samvel Babayan's United Motherland party and by the Powerful United Homeland Party
 Vitaly Balasanyan, former Secretary of the National Security Council of Artsakh
Ashot Ghulian, incumbent President of the National Assembly of Artsakh, leader of the Democratic Party of Artsakh

Conduct
140 international observers from 38 countries were registered with the Central Election Commission to monitor the election. At the time of the election, Artsakh's border with Armenia was closed to non-essential travel due to the Coronavirus pandemic. However, international observers were granted an exception provided they first test negative for COVID-19.

Several members of the United States Congress announced that their office employees and senior advisers would visit Artsakh to observe the elections. Congressman Frank Pallone stated that "We want to highlight that democracy works in Artsakh and is in accordance with all the standards of free society."

Prior to the second round of the presidential election, around 200 protesters took to the streets of Stepanakert alleging fraud in the elections held on 31 March. The protestors called for the annulment of the election results, and demanded the unconditional resignation of President Bako Sahakyan, Chief of Police Levon Mnatsakanyan and Secretary of the Security Council Arshavir Gharamyan, as well as fresh elections.

Results

President
Presidential candidate Arayik Harutyunyan came first in the first round of the presidential election. A run-off between him and incumbent Foreign Minister Masis Mayilyan was held on 14 April 2020. Masis Mayilyan made an announcement prior to the second round urging the people of Artsakh not to participate in the second round of elections in order to prevent the spread of COVID-19. As a result, the majority of Mayilyan's voters from the first round did not vote, and turnout in the second round declined by nearly 30%. However, a majority of Harutyunyan's voters did return to the polls for the second round, in spite of the call to avoid spreading COVID-19, giving him a wide margin of victory in the second round.

National Assembly
The Free Motherland - UCA Alliance, United Motherland, Justice, ARF, and the Democratic Party won seats in National Assembly. No party won the majority of seats, which means that coalition talks are likely to be held within parties.

International reaction
The European Union, the Organisation of Islamic Cooperation, the GUAM Organization for Democracy and Economic Development, the Cooperation Council of Turkic-Speaking States, several governments and embassies of several countries in Turkey or Azerbaijan announced that they did not recognize the election.

Armenian President Armen Sarkissian and Prime Minister Nikol Pashinyan both congratulated the people of Artsakh on the occasion of the elections.

See also 
 
 Elections in the Republic of Artsakh 
 List of political parties in Artsakh 
 Politics of Artsakh

References

Elections in the Republic of Artsakh
2020 in the Republic of Artsakh
Artsakh
Artsakh